Juventae Chasma is an enormous box canyon (250 km × 100 km) on Mars which opens to the north and forms the outflow channel Maja Valles.  Juventae Chasma is located north of Valles Marineris in the Coprates quadrangle and cuts more than 5 km into the plains of Lunae Planum.

Name

Juventae was named by Giovanni Schiaparelli after the mythical Juventae Fons, the fountain of youth.

Observations

The floor of Juventae Chasma is partly covered by sand dunes. There is also a 2.5 km high mountain inside Juventae, 59 km long and 23 km wide, that was confirmed by Mars Express to be composed of sulfate deposits.  MRO discovered sulfates, hydrated sulfates, and iron oxides in Juventae Chasma.  Juventae Chasma has four bright mounds or light-toned interior layered deposits (IlD's), as they are often called.  Researchers have found that monohydrated sulfates were first deposited on the floor.  And then polyhydrated sulfates were laid down.  Kieserite, a magnesium sulfate, was also found in Juventae Chasma. 
Studies from satellites orbiting Mars have found channels on the eastern, western, and southern walls of Juventae Chasma.  They seem to have different origins.  Some may have started from melting snow,  others from groundwater sapping, and still others from precipitation.  Inverted channels are also present.

Inverted relief that are visible in Juventae Chasma are also visible in other parts of Mars. This occurs when sediments are deposited on the floor of a stream and then become resistant to erosion, perhaps by cementation. Later the area may be buried. Eventually, erosion removes the covering layer and the former streams become visible since they are resistant to erosion. Mars Global Surveyor found several examples of this process.

References

See also

 Chasma
 Climate on Mars
 Geology of Mars
 HiRISE
 Inverted relief
 Lakes on Mars
 Mars Global Surveyor
 Valley networks (Mars)

Valleys and canyons on Mars
Coprates quadrangle